"The Idiots" is a short story by Joseph Conrad, his first to be published. It first appeared in The Savoy in 1896. The story was included in the Conrad collection Tales of Unrest, published in 1898.

Set in Brittany, the story describes a couple whose children have intellectual disability; the strain on the family leads eventually to murder.

Background
The story was written during Joseph Conrad's honeymoon; he rented a house on Île-Grande, on the north coast of Brittany, from April to August 1896. His wife Jessie later wrote that "much of our Île-Grande life is in that short story.... The stone-cutters are in it, our landlady is in it, and the feeling of our surroundings, perhaps a little more sombrely than the reality", and explained how the story originated: while being driven from Lannion to Île-Grande, the driver pointed out "the idiots", saying "Four - hein. And all in the same family. That's a little too much. And the priests say it's God's will!"

“The Idiots” was written in the midst of Conrad’s struggle to compose The Rescuer, a novel he would not complete and publish until 1920 under the title  The Rescue.

Conrad had a poor opinion of this story, writing that it was "an obviously derivative piece of work"; he did not name a model, but critics, among them Jocelyn Baines and Laurence Graver have supposed that it was influenced by Guy de Maupassant.

Story summary
The reader is introduced to "the idiots" as the narrator is driven near Ploumar in Brittany and they are pointed out on the road by the driver.

The earlier story of the family follows. Jean-Pierre Bacadou, returning from military service, finds his elderly father's farm is in a poor state, and resolves to make improvements. He marries Susan; the celebration of the event at the farm is picturesquely described.

Twins are born; Jean-Pierre notices something is wrong. His wife says, dully, "When they sleep they are like other people's children." A third child is born. "That child, like the other two, never smiled, never stretched its hand to her, never spoke..."

The parish priest calls on the local landowner, the Marquis de Chavanes, to say that Jean-Pierre Bacadou, a republican, has attended Mass, an unheard-of event. The Marquis, a royalist and former mayor, thinks this is significant, and thinks he will win the next communal election, since he regards Jean-Pierre as influential.

A girl is born to the couple; she is like their other children. One evening, driving through Ploumar, Jean-Pierre stops and walks up to the churchyard gates and calls, "Hey there! Come out!" Back in the cart, he says to his wife, "See? Nobody. I've been made a fool." In the autumn he angrily wanders about the fields, aware that there is no one to take over the farm.

Susan's mother, Madame Levaille, is a businesswoman who has a local granite quarry and a shop.

Jean-Pierre angrily approaches Susan, and she kills him with scissors. After telling her mother, who is appalled by her daughter's actions, she goes down to the beach, delirious. One of the seaweed-gatherers there approaches to help her, but she thinks it is Jean-Pierre's ghost. Trying to escape from him, she eventually falls from a cliff and dies.

The Marquis de Chavanes makes arrangements to have Madame Levaille made guardian of the children and administrator of the farm, rather than a member of the republican Bacadous.

Literary Influences on “The Idiot”: Maupassant and Flaubert

The inspiration for “The Idiots” was largely derived from the works of Conrad’s older French contemporaries Guy de Maupassant and Gustave Flaubert. 
Literary critic Joycyln Baines acknowledges Conrad’s debt to Maupassant with this caveat: “It is a well-told tale and effective story, but without much importance in Conrad’s work, being, as he confessed, derivative of Maupassant. The writing is a little too artificial in places, but there are some fine touches.” Baines offers this passage to demonstrate her latter point:

The story is divided into four segments: the introduction of the disabled children; the circumstances of the unfortunate parents; the violent climax in which the wife murders her husband and commits suicide; and the denouement involving the festivities at a local wedding. Literary critic Laurence Graver writes:

Graver considers Conrad’s handling of the climax of the story “preposterous”, but notes that the epilogue “returns to the terseness and irony” characteristic of Maupassant.

Critic Alfred J. Guerard  identifies the sequences in “The Idiots” describing the wedding ceremony and banquet with     Flaubert’s  Madame Bovary (1856). Guerard writes: “A brief account of the wedding procession and the feast immediately recalls Madame Bovary, and any useful derivative was from Flaubert.” Guerard further notes that the story opens with a   first-person narration, then within a few pages, shifts to an  omniscient narrative, as does the opening to Flaubert’s famous novel.

Guerard describes the story as “almost unique in Conrad’s work as an attempt to dramatize fictional material immediately after observing it.”

Theme

Literary critic Laurence Graver contrasts Conrad’s handling of his themes in “The Idiots” with his fiction written in his maturity: 

Graver adds this caveat: Unlike the protagonists in these later works, “the people in “The Idiots’ display neither resiliency or thoughtfulness, and they are victimized without ever being tested.”

In this tale of “pathetic sadness and terror”, Conrad anticipates a thematic concern that appears in his mature literary fiction. Literary critic Edward W. Said writes:

Footnotes

Sources 
Baines, Jocelyn. 1960. Joseph Conrad: A Critical Biography, McGraw-Hill Book Company, New York. 
Graver, Laurence. 1969. Conrad’s Short Fiction. University of California Press, Berkeley, California. 
  Guerard, Albert J.. 1965. Conrad: The Novelist.  Press, Cambridge, Massachusetts. LOC Catalog Card Number 58-8995.
Said, Edward W. . 1966. The Past and Present: Conrad’s Shorter Fiction, from Said’s Joseph Conrad and the Fiction of Autobiography.Harvard University Press, in Joseph Conrad: Modern Critical Reviews,  Harold Bloom editor. Chelsea House Publishers. 1987 pp. 29-51

External links
  includes "The Idiots"
 

1896 short stories
Short stories by Joseph Conrad